Manuel San Martin was born in 1881 in Distrito Federal, Mexico. A Captain in the Mexican Army and notable figure of the Mexican Revolution. He opposed corruption within the high ranks of his command in order to save the lives of prisoners wrongfully set for execution. He saved the lives of countless victims of the Mexican Revolution, where more than two (2) million people lost their lives. He married Concepcion Espinosa and they had ten children together. He died on March 25, 1965, in Distrito Federal, Mexico, at the age of 84.

References

https://archive.org/details/memoriadelasecr03marigoog

Mexican military officers
20th-century Mexican military personnel